Zephaniah Skinner (born 27 June 1989) is an Australian rules footballer who played for the  in the Australian Football League.

A Yungngora man, Skinner was born at Noonkanbah Station, several hundred kilometres east of Broome, Western Australia. Skinner was taken at number 88 in the 2010 AFL Draft.

Making his debut during the 2011 AFL season, Skinner retired from AFL football at the end of the 2012 season.

References

External links
Skinner cannot wait!

 Player profile from Western Bulldogs official website.

1989 births
Living people
Indigenous Australian players of Australian rules football
Western Bulldogs players
Australian rules footballers from the Northern Territory
People from the Kimberley (Western Australia)
Nightcliff Football Club players
Northern Territory Football Club players
Williamstown Football Club players